Sütlüce is:
 A neighborhood of Istanbul, Sütlüce, Istanbul
 The Turkish name of a village in the Famagusta District of Cyprus, Psyllatos
 The name of 18 villages across Turkey:
Sütlüce, Elâzığ
Sütlüce, Gelibolu
Sütlüce, İliç
Sütlüce, Osmancık